James Hamilton, 1st Earl of Clanbrassil PC(I) (14 August 1694 – 17 March 1758) was a British politician and peer.

Hamilton was the son of James Hamilton and Hon. Anne Mordaunt, the daughter of The 1st Viscount Mordaunt. He first stood for elected office in Ireland, and sat as the Member of the Irish House of Commons for Dundalk between 1715 and 1719. On 13 May 1719, he was created Baron Clanboye and Viscount of the City of Limerick in the Peerage of Ireland. As his titles were in the Irish peerage, he was not barred from election to the House of Commons of Great Britain and served as the MP for Wendover (1735-1741), Tavistock (1741-1747) and for Morpeth (1747-1754). On 14 April 1746, he was invested as a member of the Privy Council of Ireland. On 24 November 1756, he was created Earl of Clanbrassil, also in the Peerage of Ireland, and subsequently served as Governor of County Louth between 1756 and his death in 1758.

He married Lady Harriet Bentinck, daughter of William Bentinck, 1st Earl of Portland and Jane Martha Temple, on 15 October 1728. Together they had two children, James and Anne, who married  Robert Jocelyn, 1st Earl of Roden. He was succeeded by his only son, James Hamilton.

References

historyofparliamentonline.org, Hamilton, James, 1st Visct. Limerick [I] (c.1691-1758), of Dundalk, co. Louth.

Earls in the Peerage of Ireland
Peers of Ireland created by George I
Members of the Parliament of Great Britain for Tavistock
Irish MPs 1715–1727
British MPs 1734–1741
British MPs 1741–1747
British MPs 1747–1754
Members of the Privy Council of Ireland
1694 births
1758 deaths
18th-century Anglo-Irish people
Members of the Parliament of Ireland (pre-1801) for County Louth constituencies
Clandeboye